Jürg Hanselmann (born 23 September 1960) is a Swiss-Liechtenstenian pianist, composer and music educator. He teaches piano and composition at the Sargans Cantonal School.

Life 
Born in Grabs, Hanselmann grew up in Schaan (Principality of Liechtenstein) and received his first piano lessons from Regina Enzenhofer at the Liechtenstein Music School in Vaduz. His first compositions date back to his early youth.

At the age of 17, he was a student of Albert Schneeberger and Kristina Steinegger at the Bern Conservatory, today's University of Music and Performing Arts. There, he obtained the soloist diploma "with distinction". His further education led him to London to the Hungarian pianist Louis Kentner and to Frankfurt to the Russian pianist Irina Lein-Edelstein.

From 1983, he completed a three-year course in composition and analysis in Berne with Sándor Veress, who was a student of Zoltán Kodály and had studied piano with Béla Bartók. He also attended master classes with Mieczysław Horszowski and the Beaux Arts Trio.

His pianistic concert activities have taken Hanselmann to Switzerland, Austria, Germany, France, Luxembourg, Holland, Italy and several times to the USA. In his concert activities, duo performances with his wife Sandra Hanselmann took place. The Duo Hanselmann deals with literature for piano duo. CD recordings with piano duo works by Johannes Brahms and Josef Gabriel Rheinberger have been released on the Prezioso label. Further works for two pianos have been published by Carus-Verlag and the Bernese publishing house Müller & Schade.

As a Lied accompanist, Hanselmann cultivates his collaboration with the Austrian tenor Karl Jerolitsch, with whom he has released a recording of his Hesse Liederkreis with the Bernese music publisher Müller & Schade  Hanselmann performed chamber music concerts in trio with Claudio Veress and David Inniger. Among others, works by Sándor Veress were performed several times.

His love of music and painting also unites him in the Segantini Trio with the cellist Katharina Weissenbacher and the clarinettist Franco Mettler. For the foundation of the trio in 2017, Hanselmann composed his second clarinet trio "Triptych".

Hanselmann's compositional oeuvre is also published by Müller & Schade in Bern. In 2012, Hanselmann was awarded first prize in the composition competition of the Deutsche Oper Berlin within the chamber music series "Klang der Welt" for his work Ricercar' for wind quintet.

Among the CD recordings of Hanselmann and the Duo Hanselmann are a complete recording of the piano works of Josef Rheinberger on 11 CDs (Carus Verlag), as well as 2 CDs with piano works by Nikolai Medtner (1993 and 1998), 1 CD with works for 2 pianos by Johannes Brahms. A collection of piano pieces on the theme "The railway in piano music" contains, among others, Rossini's Un petit train de plaisir and Honegger's piano arrangement of his orchestral piece Pacific 231, a first recording in this piano version.

Since March 2015 Hanselmann has been President of the International Josef Gabriel Rheinberger Society IRG, based in Vaduz.

 Awards and prizes 

 1980: Eduard Tschumi Prize, Bern
 1980: Prize of the Jubilee Foundation of the Swiss Volksbank, Berne
 1983: Migros Competition, Zurich
 1987: Rotary Prize, Liechtenstein
 1991: Culture Prize of the International Lake Constance Conference, Munich
 2005: Josef Gabriel von Rheinberger Prize, Vaduz
 2012: 1st prize in the composition competition "Klang der Welt" of the Deutsche Oper Berlin

 Compositions 
 Instrumental music 
Piano music solo
 Lyrical pieces, 1976/1979
 Four piano pieces, 1983
 Lyrical pieces, 2001
 Passacaglia (Homage to Rheinberger), 2003
 Three pieces of railway, 2004
 Railway Sonatina, 2005
 1st sonata, 2005/2006
 Night play, 2006
 Toccata American, 2006
 Wind Chimes, 2007
 Three concert etudes, 2007
 Abendstern - Four pieces for piano, 2011
 Youth album, 2011
 Two album pages for Rebecca, 2011
 Passacaglia, 2013
 8 epigrams in canonical form, 2013
 Four nocturnes for piano, 2014
 A little musical nonsense (Sonatina Buffa) for piano, 2015
 Autumn Sonata for piano, 2015
 6 Préludes for piano, 2016
 11 mood pictures in canonical form for piano, 2016
 2nd sonata for piano, 2016
 4 concert etudes for piano, 2016
 4 Elegiac Pieces for piano, 2017
 Segantini studies for piano, 2018
 November, seven mood pictures for piano, 2018
 Scenes of children, 2019
 January, 8 mood pictures for piano, 2019
 Two Ophelia Fantasias for piano, 2019
 Hymnus 2007, arrangement for piano

Piano music for several players
 Elements, 1993/1994
 Youth album for piano for one, two, three & four hands, 1996
 Tabulatura (old dances and tunes) for 2 pianos and percussion, 2005
 Tabulatura (old dances and tunes), version for 2 pianos, 2005
 Sonata for two pianos, 2008
 SALtarello, 2010, arranged as concert version for two pianos
 Paradise Lost, 2010, arranged as concert version for 2 pianos
 Tarantella, 2010, arranged as concert version for 2 pianos
 Toccata for two pianos, 2013
 Notturno for two pianos, 2013
 Sonata for piano 4 hands, 2015

Concertante piecesDies Irae, Variations for two pianos and orchestra, 2005
Concert for the left hand, for piano and orchestra, 2008
Concert for two pianos and orchestra, 2016

Orchestral pieces
 Sinfonietta for orchestra, 2007
 Hymn for orchestra, 2007
 Hymnus for string orchestra (short version), 2007
 Hymn for harp and strings (short version), 2009
 Partita for chamber orchestra, 2009
 SALtarello, concert overture for large orchestra 2009
 Paradise Lost for orchestra, 2010
 Tarantella for orchestra, 2010
 "Euridice" - Notturno for orchestra, 2011
 Ikarus for string orchestra, 2013, rev. 2018

Chamber music
 "Lamentationes" for viola and piano, 2007-2008
 Partita for string quintet, 2009
 Ricercare for wind quintet, 2011
 "Orfeo" - Notturno for piano and wind quintet, 2011
 Toccata for piano and wind quintet, 2014
 Trio for piano, violin and violoncello, 2014
 Trio for piano, clarinet and violoncello, 2015
 Autumn sonata for harp, 2015
 3 Elegiac Vocalises for soprano, clarinet and piano, 2016
 Notturno for violin, violoncello and piano, 2016
 Sonata for clarinet in A and piano, 2016
 2nd Trio for clarinet, violoncello and piano, "Triptych", 2017
 Sonata for violin and piano, 2018

 Vocal music 
Lieder with piano accompaniment
 Liederkreis nach Gedichten von Hermann Hesse für Gesang (Tenor) und Klavier, 2011
 Drei Lieder nach Gedichten von Sebastien Fanzun für Tenor und Klavier, 2012
 Matutinal, Liederzyklus nach Gedichten von Sebastien Fanzun für Tenor und Klavier, 2013
 An Mauern hin, Liederkreis nach Gedichten von Georg Trakl, 2016

Choir a cappella
2 Sacred Lieder for mixed choir, 2010

CantataIn Sand geschrieben, Cantata for soli, choir and orchestra after poems by Hermann Hesse, 2011

Rrevisions 
Musik der Renaissance, 2008 (23 Tänze und Weisen aus Orgeltabulaturbüchern, eingerichtet für den Unterricht für Klavier zu 4 Händen)
Josef Gabriel Rheinberger: Singspiel Der arme Heinrich'', op. 37 (Instrumentation)
Josef Gabriel Rheinberger: Concert für Pianoforte Es-dur JWV 128 (Instrumentation)

References

External links 
 
 
 

Swiss classical pianists
20th-century classical composers
21st-century classical composers
Liechtenstein composers
1960 births
Living people